Makhazen Naft (also Romanized as Makhāzen Naft) is a village in Eslamiyeh Rural District, in the Central District of Rafsanjan County, Kerman Province, Iran. At the 2006 census, its population was 313, in 79 families.

References 

Populated places in Rafsanjan County